Extreme A&E is a British medical documentary set in various trauma centres across the world. It follows Kevin Fong as he visits world-renowned trauma centres. It aims to show trauma medicine through the eyes of a doctor.

Overview
This Channel 4 documentary series gives viewers behind the scenes access to four major international Accident & Emergency Departments. Series 1 aired every Thursday 10pm and consisted of four one-hour episodes. The filming took place over a week at each location.

The programmes show the way the staff work together as a team to treat seriously ill patients involved in road traffic accidents and violent assaults.

Episode 1 - Melbourne 
Episode 2 - The Bronx 
Episode 3 - London 
Episode 4 - Johannesburg

The series will premiere as Extreme ER in Australia on 4 June 2015 on Nat Geo People.

References

External links

2012 British television series debuts
2012 British television series endings
2010s British documentary television series
2010s British medical television series
Channel 4 documentary series
English-language television shows
Television shows set in London
Television shows set in Melbourne
Television shows set in New York City
Television shows set in South Africa